This list of Super Rugby records is a list of records from the Super Rugby rugby union competition (including its previous names as Super 12 and Super 14), which began in 1996, following a deal with SANZAR and News Limited.

Match records

Most points (team)
 Super 12 era: 96, Crusaders (vs Waratahs (11 May 2002))
 Super 14 era: 92, Bulls (vs Reds (5 May 2007))
 Super Rugby (15) era: 72, Waratahs (vs Kings (4 May 2013))
 Super Rugby (18) era: 94, Lions (vs Sunwolves (1 July 2017))
 Super Rugby regional comps era: 64,  (vs  (14 May 2021)
 Super Rugby Pacific (12) era: 71,  (vs  (6 May 2022)

Greatest aggregate
 Super 12 era: 118, Sharks 75–43 Highlanders (8 March 1997)
 Super 14 era: 137, Lions 65–72 Chiefs (19 February 2010)
 Super Rugby (15) era: 103, Blues 40–63 Sharks (31 March 2018)
 Super Rugby (18) era: 111, Crusaders 85–26 Rebels (9 July 2016)
 Super Rugby regional comps era: 112,  48–64  (14 May 2021)
 Super Rugby Pacific (12) era: 99,  71–28  (6 May 2022)

Greatest aggregate in a final
 Super 12 era: 85, Brumbies 47–38 Crusaders (2004)
 Super 14 era: 78, Bulls 61–17 Chiefs (2009)
 Super Rugby (15) era: 65, Waratahs 33–32 Crusaders (2014)
 Super Rugby (18) era:  42, Crusaders 25–17 Lions (2017)
 Super Rugby regional comps era: 51,  28–23  (2020 AU)
 Super Rugby Pacific (12) era: 28,  7–21  (2022)

Fewest points conceded in a final
 Super 12 era: 6, Brumbies (vs Sharks (2001))
 Super 14 era: 12, Crusaders (vs Hurricanes (2006)), (vs Waratahs (2008))
 Super Rugby (15) era: 3, Crusaders (vs Jaguares (2019))
 Super Rugby (18) era: 3, Hurricanes (vs Lions (2016))
 Super Rugby regional comps era: 13,  (vs  (2021 NZ))
 Super Rugby Pacific (12) era: 7,  (vs  (2022)

Lowest aggregate
 Super 12 era: 11, Reds 11–0 Hurricanes (27 February 1999), Sharks 5–6 Reds (24 April 2004)
 Super 14 era: 6, Highlanders 6–0 Crusaders (7 March 2009)
 Super Rugby (15) era: 16, Stormers 16–0 Bulls (5 July 2014)
 Super Rugby (18) era: 18, Sharks 9–9 Rebels (22 April 2017)
 Super Rugby regional comps era: 17,  7–10  (12 March 2021)
 Super Rugby Pacific (12) era: 25,  0–25  (9 April 2022)

Most points away
 Super 12 era: 60, Blues (vs Hurricanes (22 February 2002))
 Super 14 era: 72, Chiefs (vs Lions (19 February 2010))
 Super Rugby (15) era: 72, Waratahs (vs Southern Kings (4 May 2013))
 Super Rugby (18) era: 83, Hurricanes (vs Sunwolves (25 February 2017))
 Super Rugby regional comps era: 64,  (vs  (14 May 2021)
 Super Rugby Pacific (12) era: 59,  (vs  (19 March 2022)

Largest winning margin
 Super 12 era: 77, Crusaders 96–19 Waratahs (11 May 2002)
 Super 14 era: 89, Bulls 92–3 Reds (5 May 2007)
 Super Rugby (15) era: 66, Crusaders 66–0 Rebels (8 June 2019)
 Super Rugby (18) era: 87, Lions 94–7 Sunwolves (1 July 2017)
 Super Rugby regional comps era: 52,  5–57  (21 August 2020)
 Super Rugby Pacific (12) era: 62,  67–5  (8 May 2022)

Most penalty goals
 Super 12 era: 8, Highlanders (vs Chiefs (21 February 2003))
 Super 14 era: 9, Hurricanes (vs Blues (12 February 2010))
 Super Rugby (15) era: 9, Lions (vs Cheetahs (25 February 2012))
 Super Rugby (18) era: 6, Rebels (vs Reds (12 March 2016)), Sharks (vs Jaguares (14 May 2016)), Sharks (vs Southern Kings (13 May 2017)), Jaguares (vs Southern Kings (25 February 2017)), Cheetahs (vs Lions (25 February 2017))
 Super Rugby regional comps era: 8,  (vs  (6 March 2021))
 Super Rugby Pacific (12) era: 5,  (vs  (8 April 2022)

Largest winning margin in a Final
 Super 12 era: 30, Brumbies (vs Sharks (2001))
 Super 14 era: 44, Bulls (vs Chiefs (2009))
 Super Rugby (15) era: 31, Chiefs (vs Sharks (2012))
 Super Rugby regionalised era: 11,  (vs  (2021 NZ))
 Super Rugby Pacific (12) era: 14,  (vs  (2022)

Most tries (one team)
 Super 12 era: 14, Crusaders (vs Waratahs (11 May 2002))
 Super Rugby (18) era: 14, Cheetahs (vs Sunwolves (15 April 2016)), Lions (vs Sunwolves (1 July 2017))
 Super Rugby regionalised comps era: 10,  (vs  (14 May 2021))
 Super Rugby Pacific (12) era: 11,  (vs  (6 May 2022),  (vs  (8 May 2022)

Most tries (both teams combined)
 Super 12 era: 17, Crusaders vs Waratahs (11 May 2002)
 Super 14 era: 18, Lions vs Chiefs (19 February 2010)
 Super Rugby (15) era: 14, Cheetahs vs Waratahs (6 June 2015)
 Super Rugby (18) era: 17, Crusaders vs Rebels (9 July 2016)
 Super Rugby regionalised comps era: 17,  vs  (14 May 2021)
 Super Rugby Pacific (12) era: 15,  vs  (6 May 2022)

Most tries (individual)
5 Tries in a match
 Sean Wainui, Chiefs (vs Waratahs (12 June 2021))
4 Tries in a match
 Joe Roff, Brumbies (vs Sharks (29 March 1996))
 Gavin Lawless,  (vs Highlanders (8 March 1997))
 Stefan Terblanche, Sharks (vs Chiefs (25 April 1998))
 Joeli Vidiri, Blues (vs Bulls (22 April 2000))
 Doug Howlett, Blues (vs Hurricanes (22 February 2002))
 Malili Muliaina, Blues (vs Bulls (19 April 2002))
 Caleb Ralph, Crusaders (vs Waratahs (11 May 2002))
 Sitiveni Sivivatu, Chiefs (vs Blues (21 March 2009))
 Drew Mitchell, Waratahs (vs Lions (12 March 2010))
 Sean Maitland, Crusaders (vs Brumbies (11 March 2011))
 Asaeli Tikoirotuma, Chiefs (vs Blues (2 June 2012))
 Charlie Ngatai, Chiefs (vs Force (26 March 2016))
 Huw Jones, Stormers (vs Southern Kings (16 July 2016))
 Courtnall Skosan, Lions (vs Reds (18 March 2017))
 Ben Lam, Hurricanes (vs Rebels (30 March 2018))
 Madosh Tambwe, Lions (vs Stormers (7 April 2018))
 Ngani Laumape, Hurricanes (vs Blues (7 July 2018))
 Rieko Ioane, Blues (vs Sunwolves (9 March 2019))
 Jonah Lowe,  (vs  (22 April 2022)

Most points (individual)
 Super 12 era: 50, Gavin Lawless (Sharks vs Highlanders (8 March 1997))
 Super 14 era: 35, Morné Steyn (Bulls vs Brumbies (20 February 2010))
 Super Rugby (15) era: 38, Robert du Preez (Sharks vs Blues (Super Rugby) (31 March 2018))
 Super Rugby regionalised comps era: 31, Richie Mo'unga ( vs  (22 May 2021))
 Super Rugby Pacific (12) era: 21, Stephen Perofeta ( vs  (6 May 2022)

Most penalties (individual)
 Super 12 era: 8, Jannie Kruger (Bulls vs Highlanders (20 March 1996)), Willie Walker (Highlanders vs Chiefs (21 February 2003))
 Super 14 era: 8, Meyer Bosman (Stormers vs Cheetahs (18 March 2006)), Derick Hougaard (Bulls vs Crusaders (12 May 2007))
 Super Rugby (15) era: 9, Elton Jantjies (Lions vs Cheetahs (25 February 2012))
 Super Rugby (18) era: 6, Jack Debreczeni (Rebels vs Reds (12 Mar 2016)), Patrick Lambie (Sharks vs Jaguares (14 May 2016)), Fred Zeilinga (Cheetahs vs Lions (25 Feb 2017)), Curwin Bosch (Sharks vs Waratahs (11 Mar 2017))
 Super Rugby regionalised comps era: 8, Matt To'omua ( vs  (6 March 2021))
 Super Rugby Pacific (12) era: 4, Mitch Hunt ( vs  (25 February 2022), Teti Tela ( vs  (4 March 2022), Will Harrison ( vs  (13 March 2022), Matt To'omua ( vs  (19 March 2022), Noah Lolesio ( vs  (7 May 2022)

Most conversions (individual)
 Super 12 era: 13, Andrew Mehrtens (Crusaders vs Waratahs (11 May 2002))
 Super 14 era: 11, Derick Hougaard (Bulls vs Reds (5 May 2007))
 Super Rugby (15) era: 9, Beauden Barrett (Hurricanes vs Rebels (26 May 2012))
 Super Rugby (18) era: 9, Nicolás Sánchez (Jaguares vs Southern Kings (30 April 2016)), Otere Black (Hurricanes vs Sunwolves (25 Feb 2017))
 Super Rugby regionalised era: 8, Richie Mo'unga ( vs  (22 May 2021))
 Super Rugby Pacific (12) era: 8, Stephen Perofeta ( vs  (6 May 2022), Sam Gilbert ( vs  (13 May 2022), Fergus Burke ( vs  (20 May 2022)

Season records
N.B.: Team records are for the regular season, individual records include finals.

Most points for (team)
 Super 12 era: 469, Crusaders (2002)
 Super 14 era: 436, Bulls (2010)
 Super Rugby (15) era: 489, Hurricanes (2012)
 Super Rugby (18) era: 596, Hurricanes (2017)
 Super Rugby regionalised comps era: 271,  (2021 AU)
 Super Rugby Pacific (12) era: 472,  (2022)

Most points against (team)
 Super 12 era: 500, Bulls (2002)
 Super 14 era: 585, Lions (2010)
 Super Rugby (15) era: 570, Rebels (2011)
 Super Rugby (18) era: 684, Southern Kings (2016)
 Super Rugby regional comps era: 292,  (2021 AU)
 Super Rugby Pacific (12) era: 518,  (2022)

Fewest points for (team)
 Super 12 era: 185, Reds (2005)
 Super 14 era: 175, Lions (2007)
 Super Rugby (15) era: 245, Force (2015)
 Super Rugby (18) era: 236, Rebels (2017)
 Super Rugby regional comps era: 82,  (2021 TT),  (2021 TT)
 Super Rugby Pacific (12) era: 261,  (2022)

Fewest points against (team)
 Super 12 era: 170, Reds (1999)
 Super 14 era: 171, Stormers (2010)
 Super Rugby (15) era: 252, Waratahs (2011)
 Super Rugby (18) era: 268, Lions (2017)
 Super Rugby regional comps era: 79  (2021 TT)
 Super Rugby Pacific (12) era: 268  (2022)

Best points difference
 Super 12 era: 234, Crusaders, (2002)
 Super 14 era: 202, Crusaders, (2006)
 Super Rugby (15) era: 209, Waratahs, (2014)
 Super Rugby (18) era: 324, Hurricanes, (2017)
 Super Rugby regional comps era: 119, (2021 TT)
 Super Rugby Pacific (12) era: 202, (2022)

Worst points difference
 Super 12 era: −268, Bulls (2002)
 Super 14 era: −315, Lions (2010)
 Super Rugby (15) era: −289, Rebels (2011)
 Super Rugby (18) era: −402, Southern Kings (2016)
 Super Rugby regional comps era: −154,  (2021 AU)
 Super Rugby Pacific (12) era: −257,  (2022)

Most competition points
 Super 12 era: 51, Crusaders (2002)
 Super 14 era: 52, Crusaders (2008)
 Super Rugby (15) era: 66, Reds* (2011), Stormers* (2012), Chiefs* (2013), Hurricanes (2015)
 Super Rugby (18) era: 65, Lions (2017)
 Super Rugby regional comps: 33,  (2021 AU)
 Super Rugby Pacific (12) era: 58,  (2022)

*(Note: Prior to 2014, teams received 4 points per bye)

Fewest competition points by a team which qualified for knockout stage
 Super 12 era: 30, Sharks (1997)
 Super 14 era: 38, Bulls (2006)
 Super Rugby (15) era: 42, Highlanders (2014)
 Super Rugby (18) era: 34, Brumbies (2017)
 Super Rugby regional comps era: 18,  (2021 AU)
 Super Rugby Pacific (12) era: 23,  (2022)

Fewest competition points (not including byes)
 Super 12 era: 0, Bulls (2002)
 Super 14 era: 1, Lions (2010)
 Super Rugby (15) era: 16 Rebels (2011), Southern Kings (2013)
 Super Rugby (18) era: 9, Southern Kings, Sunwolves (2016), Rebels (2017)
 Super Rugby regional comps era: 0,  (2021 TT)
 Super Rugby Pacific (12) era: 10,  (2022)

Fewest competition points (including byes)
 Super 12 era: 4, Bulls (2002)
 Super 14 era: 5, Lions (2010)
 Super Rugby (15) era: 19, Force (2015)
 Super Rugby (18) era: 9, Southern Kings, Sunwolves (2016), Rebels (2017)
 Super Rugby regional comps era: 0,  (2021 TT)
 Super Rugby Pacific (12) era: 10,  (2022)

Most tries (team)
 Super 12 era: 71, Crusaders (2005)
 Super 14 era: 53, Crusaders (2006, 2008)
 Super Rugby (15) era: 63, Highlanders (2015)
 Super Rugby (18) era: 89, Hurricanes (2017)
 Super Rugby regional comps era: 37  (2021 AU)
 Super Rugby Pacific (12) era: 64  (2022,  (2022,  (2022

Fewest tries (team)
 Super 12 era: 20, Sharks (2002)
 Super 14 era: 13, Lions (2007)
 Super Rugby (15) era: 25, Force (2011)
 Super Rugby (18) era: 23, Rebels (2017)
 Super Rugby regional comps era: 11,  (2021 TT)
 Super Rugby Pacific (12) era: 30,  (2022)

Most wins
 Super 12 era: 11, Crusaders (2002)
 Super 14 era: 11, Crusaders (2006, 2008)
 Super Rugby (15) era: 14, Stormers (2012), Hurricanes (2015)
 Super Rugby (18) era: 14, Lions, Crusaders (2017)
 Super Rugby regional comps era: 7,  (2021 AU)
 Super Rugby Pacific (12) era: 13,  (2022)

Most defeats
 Super 12 era: 11, Bulls (2002)
 Super 14 era: 13, Lions (2010)
 Super Rugby (15) era: 13, Rebels (2011) and Highlanders (2013)
 Super Rugby (18) era: 13, Force, Southern Kings, Sunwolves (2016), Rebels (2017)
 Super Rugby regional comps era: 8,  (2021 AU)
 Super Rugby Pacific (12) era: 12,  (2022),  (2022)

Most points (individual)
 Super 12 era: 206, Andrew Mehrtens (Crusaders) (1998)
 Super 14 era: 263, Morné Steyn (Bulls) (2010)
 Super Rugby (15) era: 257, Bernard Foley (Waratahs) (2014)
 Super Rugby (18) era: 223, Beauden Barrett (Hurricanes) (2016)
 Super Rugby regional comps: 121, James O'Connor (2021 AU)
 Super Rugby Pacific (12) era: 129, Stephen Perofeta ( (2022)

Most tries (individual)
 Super 12 era: 15, Joe Roff (Brumbies) (1997) and Rico Gear (Crusaders) (2005)
 Super 14 era: 12, JP Pietersen (Sharks) (2007)
 Super Rugby (15) era: 13, Waisake Naholo (Highlanders) (2015)
 Super Rugby (18) era: 15, Ngani Laumape (Hurricanes) (2017)
 Super Rugby (15) era: 16, Ben Lam (Hurricanes) (2018)
 Super Rugby regional comps era: 7, Codie Taylor (2021 NZ)
 Super Rugby Pacific (12) era: 10, Leicester Fainga'anuku ( (2022), Will Jordan ( (2022), Sevu Reece ( (2022)

Most conversions (individual)
 Super 12 era: 51, Joe Roff (Brumbies) (2004)
 Super 14 era: 38, Dan Carter (Crusaders) (2006)
 Super Rugby (15) era: 45, Bernard Foley (Waratahs) (2014)
 Super Rugby (18) era: 54, Elton Jantjies (Lions) (2017)
 Super Rugby regional comps era: 25, James O'Connor (2021 AU)
 Super Rugby Pacific (12) era: 40, Bryn Gatland (2022)

Most penalty goals (individual)
 Super 12 era: 43, Andrew Mehrtens (Crusaders) (1999)
 Super 14 era: 41, Morné Steyn (Bulls) (2010)
 Super Rugby (15) era: 58, Christian Lealiifano (Brumbies) (2013)
 Super Rugby (18) era: 32, Curwin Bosch (Sharks) (2017)
 Super Rugby regional comps era: 27, Matt To'omua (2021 AU)
 Super Rugby Pacific (12) era: 18, Noah Lolesio ( (2022), Richie Mo'unga ( (2022)

Career records

Most games

 

Bold indicates players taking part in the 2023 Super Rugby Pacific season.

Most points

 

Bold indicates players taking part in the 2023 Super Rugby Pacific season.

Most tries

 

Bold indicates players taking part in the 2023 Super Rugby Pacific season.

Most conversions

 

Bold indicates players taking part in the 2023 Super Rugby Pacific season.

Most penalties

 

Bold indicates players taking part in the 2023 Super Rugby Pacific season.

Most drop goals
 

Bold indicates players taking part in the 2023 Super Rugby Pacific season.

References
McIlraith, Matt (2005). Ten Years of Super 12 Hodder Moa, Hachette Livre NZ Ltd. 

 Super14 Statistics

Super Rugby
Records